"Tush" is a song by American blues rock band ZZ Top and was the only single from their fourth album Fandango!. The song was named the 67th best hard rock song of all time by VH1.

Composition
The song is a twelve-bar blues in the key of G in standard tuning. Bassist Dusty Hill has said the song was written at a sound check in about ten minutes.  The recording was produced by Bill Ham and recorded and mixed by Terry Manning. The title is a double entendre, referring both to slang for buttocks (with the connotation of "a piece of ass"), and slang for "luxurious" or "lavish", according to a 1985 interview with Hill in Spin magazine.

Gibbons said "We were in Florence, Alabama, playing in a rodeo arena with a dirt floor. We decided to play a bit in the afternoon. I hit that opening lick, and Dave Blayney, our lighting director, gave us the hand [twirls a finger in the air]: "Keep it going." I leaned over to Dusty and said, "Call it 'Tush.'"

The Texas singer Roy Head had a flip side in 1966, "Tush Hog." Down South, the word meant deluxe, plush. And a tush hog was very deluxe. We had the riff going, Dusty fell in with the vocal, and we wrote it in three minutes. We had the advantage of that dual meaning of the word "tush" [grins]. It's that secret blues language — saying it without saying it."

Reception
Cash Box said that it has "some slide lead guitar work that'll have 'em bumpin' their 'tushes' from Dallas to L.A." and called the song "super summer dance rock and roll." Record World said the song "comes in a tight little hard rock package, just waiting to be let loose to boogie, boogie, boogie!"

Hill's death
As the closing song in their setlists for many tours "Tush" would be the last song Hill would sing. After the death of Hill in 2021, the band performed the song for the first time on July 30, 2021, in Tuscaloosa, Alabama, with Gibbons placing Dusty's hat on his microphone then Gibbons taking lead vocals to the song. A few tour dates later on August 6, Gibbons told the crowd “We’re going to have Dusty singing through the magic of Memorex.” The band would now end their concerts by playing the song along to an audio vocal recording from Hill's last performance.

Chart performance
"Tush" peaked at number twenty on the U.S. Billboard Hot 100.  In Chicago, "Tush" peaked at number five on WLS.

Year-end Chart

Personnel
Billy Gibbonsguitar
Dusty Hillbass guitar, vocals
Frank Bearddrums

References

External links
 

ZZ Top songs
Songs written by Frank Beard (musician)
Songs written by Dusty Hill
Songs written by Billy Gibbons
1975 singles
1975 songs
London Records singles
Songs about Texas
Song recordings produced by Bill Ham